IBM WorkPad was a line of portable devices, produced by Palm Inc. and branded by IBM. This line contained personal digital assistants (PDAs) and one subnotebook model (WorkPad Z50).

Overview 
This line was released in 1997 and discontinued in 2002. After discontinuation of its self-branded line, IBM still offers the main Palm line on its site.

This IBM-branded line of PDAs were rebranded PalmPilots, with only a few software improvements (easy sync for Lotus Notes, DB2 EveryPlace, and IBM Mobile Connect).

Reception 
Early WorkPad PDAs were received positively, similar to parallel Palm models; but later this conservative business-oriented line lacked notability, and multimedia options of latest models were described as relatively poor.

Models 
WorkPad Z50 - 1999, subnotebook/thin client, powered by Windows CE, equipped with an NEC MIPS processor and with an 8.2" screen.

PDAs

All WorkPad PDAs have a similar gray-scale screen (with better resolution and contrast for C series, but with same physical size and similar layout); only the c505 model has a color screen. The WorkPad 30X can be upgraded to a Japanese version, using the Open Extension slot.

WorkPad - 1997, rebadged PalmPilot

WorkPad 20X - 1998, rebadged Palm III

WorkPad 30X - 1999, rebadged Palm IIIx

WorkPad 30J - 1999, Japanese version of 30X

WorkPad 31J - 2000, same as 30J, but with PHS broadband module.

WorkPad 31A - 2000, version of 31J with locked phone operator.

C series with new thin, sleek metal case:

WorkPad c3 -1999/2000, rebadged Palm V/Vx; also known as WorkPad 40J and WorkPad 50J.

WorkPad c500 -2001, rebadged Palm m500; also known as WorkPad 60U.

WorkPad c505 -2001, rebadged Palm m505; also known as WorkPad 70J.

Accessories 
Most WorkPad PDAs can use the same peripherals as the PalmPilot; for example, the external keyboard available for some models, and most WorkPads can be attached to a cradle for charging or connection to a PC; the WorkPad can be attached to a Palm cradle, and vice versa.

Some WorkPads (and sibling Palm models) can be attached to some ThinkPad laptops, using an Ultrabay cradle; This would be the Palm V, m500, m505, and the WorkPad c500 and c505 models.

See also 

 PDA
 ThinkPad laptops
 WatchPad smartwatches
 ChipCard phone
 List of Palm OS devices

References 

Palm OS devices
IBM products
Computer-related introductions in 1997